Arantxa Sánchez-Vicario and Natasha Zvereva were the defending champions but only Zvereva competed that year with Mary Pierce.

Pierce and Zvereva won in the final 6–3, 6–4 against Lisa Raymond and Rennae Stubbs.

Seeds
Champion seeds are indicated in bold text while text in italics indicates the round in which those seeds were eliminated.

 Lisa Raymond /  Rennae Stubbs (final)
 Conchita Martínez /  Patricia Tarabini (quarterfinals)
 Katrina Adams /  Larisa Neiland (first round)
 Elena Likhovtseva /  Ai Sugiyama (first round)

Draw

External links
 1998 Kremlin Cup Women's Doubles Draw

Kremlin Cup
Kremlin Cup